Ohiya is a rural village located in Badulla District of Uva Province, Sri Lanka. It is much closer to the Horton Plains National Park. The picturesque Colombo -Badulla Railway runs through Ohiya. Ohiya  is in the Welimada Divisional Secretariat Division  and the Grama Niladhari Division number is 62A.

Ohiya is one of the most scenic places in Sri Lanka. On a clear day the view from the Ohiya Gap/Dondra Watch extends up to the southern coast of Sri Lanka.

Population
 (Source Welimada Divisional Secretariat 2008-statistics)

Transport
 B508 – Welimada – Ohiya (Bus route via  Boralanda)

Attractions
 Ohiya Gap/Dondra Watch, from this vantage point, which looks out over the Haputale valley, the Dondra Head Lighthouse is occasionally visible.
 Ohiya Forest

Postal services
 Ohiya Sub Post Office (Postal Code 90168)

Schools
 B/Ohiya Siddharatha Vidyalaya

See also
Towns in Uva
History of Uva Province

Railway Line Continuity

References

Populated places in Badulla District
Populated places in Uva Province